Kurt Peter Gerhardsson (born 22 August 1959) is a Swedish football manager and former football player. He was previously the manager of BK Häcken. Before the start of the 2013 Allsvenskan he was ranked as the best manager in the league by newspaper Aftonbladet.

On 29 November 2016 it was announced that he would take over as manager of the Swedish women's national team after Pia Sundhage following UEFA Women's Euro 2017.

Honours

Manager
BK Häcken
Swedish Cup: 2015–16
Sweden
2019 FIFA Women's World Cup: Third place
2020 Summer Olympics: Silver medal

References

1959 births
Living people
Swedish footballers
Swedish football managers
Hammarby Fotboll players
Vasalunds IF players
Enköpings SK players
BK Häcken managers
Association football forwards
Sweden women's national football team managers
2019 FIFA Women's World Cup managers
Footballers from Uppsala
UEFA Women's Euro 2022 managers